Dhimitër Stamo (6 November 1931 – 11 November 2006) was an Albanian diplomat who served as Albanian ambassador to China during the 1980s.

Mandates 
He served as the Albanian Ambassador to Romania until 1970. 

Stamo served as Albanian Charge D'affairs of Hungary from 1970 to 1975.

Stamo then transferred to Cambodia as the Albanian Ambassador during the Khmer Rouge from 1975 to 1978. During this time he took residence in Phnom Penh during the brutal Khmer Rouge regime, which he later documented in his memoirs in Italian, "Tre Anni con i Khmer Rossi", (Three Years with the Khmer Rouge).  He was the first European ambassador who personally met all red khmers (khmers rouges) leadership: Pol Pot, Khieu Sampham, Ieng Sary, Son Sen, Vorn Vet, So Phim, Ieng Thirith, Thiounn Thioeun, and others comprising Sihanouk and his wife Monique), and he entirely lived those horrible years. 

Stamo served as Albanian Ambassador to China from 1981 to 1986.

In 1987, he became Albanian Ambassador to Myanmar (then Burma).

References

1931 births
2006 deaths
Ambassadors of Albania to China
Place of birth missing
Ambassadors of Albania to Hungary
Ambassadors of Albania to Romania
Ambassadors of Albania to Cambodia
Ambassadors of Albania to Myanmar